Bafata may refer to:

 Bafatá Region of Guinea-Bissau
 Bafatá, city and seat of the Bafatá Region of Guinea-Bissau
 Bafata, Oio, Guinea-Bissau